Andrés Fabián Ponce Núñez (born 11 November 1996) is a Venezuelan professional footballer who plays for Russian First League club FC Akron Tolyatti.

Career

Club
On 27 July 2018, Ponce signed with the Russian Premier League club FC Anzhi Makhachkala.

On 4 June 2019, Ponce signed a 4-year contract with another Russian Premier League club FC Akhmat Grozny. On 16 October 2020, he was loaned to FC Rotor Volgograd. On 7 August 2021, his contract with Akhmat was terminated by mutual consent.

On 31 August 2021, he joined Danish club Vejle. On 29 January 2023, Vejle confirmed that Ponce's contract had been terminated by mutual agreement. Later on the same day, he signed with Russian First League club FC Akron Tolyatti.

International
Ponce rose recognition for his performance in the 2013 South American U-17 Championship, in which he scored seven goals and helped to his nation to fit a spot in the upcoming 2013 FIFA U-17 World Cup.

Career statistics

Club

International goals
Scores and results list Venezuela's goal tally first.

Honours

Club

Individual
Miglior Marcatore Del Campionato Primavera Tim: 2015–16.

National
Venezuela
Kirin Cup:2019

References

External links 
Deportivo Táchira official profile 

1996 births
Living people
Sportspeople from Maracaibo
Venezuelan footballers
Venezuela international footballers
Association football forwards
Deportivo Táchira F.C. players
Llaneros de Guanare players
U.C. Sampdoria players
S.C. Olhanense players
FC Lugano players
U.S. Livorno 1915 players
FC Anzhi Makhachkala players
FC Akhmat Grozny players
FC Rotor Volgograd players
Vejle Boldklub players
FC Akron Tolyatti players
Venezuelan Primera División players
Liga Portugal 2 players
Serie A players
Swiss Super League players
Serie C players
Russian Premier League players
Venezuelan expatriate footballers
Expatriate footballers in Portugal
Expatriate footballers in Italy
Expatriate footballers in Switzerland
Expatriate footballers in Russia
Expatriate men's footballers in Denmark
Venezuelan people of Colombian descent
2015 South American Youth Football Championship players
Venezuelan expatriate sportspeople in Portugal
Venezuelan expatriate sportspeople in Italy
Venezuelan expatriate sportspeople in Switzerland
Venezuelan expatriate sportspeople in Russia